Chloritis planorbina is a species of air-breathing land snail, a terrestrial pulmonate gastropod mollusk in the family Camaenidae.

Distribution 
The type locality is Roembia, South-eastern Sulawesi, Indonesia. The species has been described after two specimens and it has not been recorded again.

Shell description 
The shell is moderately in size for the genus, without hairs and brownish corneous. The spire is somewhat impressed. The shell is umbilicated. The ends of the peristome are connected by a thin callus. The width of the shell is 19.5–24 mm.

References
This article incorporates CC-BY-3.0 text from the reference.

Further reading 
  Zilch A. (1966). "Die Typen und Typoide des Natur-Museums Senckenberg, 35: Mollusca, Camaenidae (5)". Archiv für Molluskenkunde 95: 293-319, pls 1-5. Page 295, pl. 7 fig. 9.

Camaenidae
Gastropods described in 1912